These are the official results of the men's high jump event at the 1997 IAAF World Championships in Athens, Greece. There were a total number of 35 participating athletes, with two qualifying groups and the final held on Wednesday 1997-08-06.

Medalists

Results

Qualifying round
4 August

Qualification: Qualifying Performance 2.28 (Q) or at least 12 best performers (q) advance to the final.

Final

See also
 1994 Men's European Championships High Jump
 1995 Men's World Championships High Jump
 1996 Men's Olympic High Jump
 1998 Men's European Championships High Jump
 1999 Men's World Championships High Jump

References
 Results

H
High jump at the World Athletics Championships